Guy Clyde Conti (born March 9, 1942) is a senior advisor and the former Major League Baseball bullpen coach for the New York Mets. He was one of Willie Randolph's first hires as manager in winter  and began as a coach in the  season. Prior to joining the Mets, Conti held various coaching positions in the Los Angeles Dodgers' minor league system, where he befriended Sandy Koufax and also worked with young pitchers such as Pedro Martínez and Ismael Valdez. Martinez credits Conti for teaching him English when Conti coached Martinez in Great Falls, Montana, calling him "my white daddy." Conti briefly played in the Houston Astros organization as a catcher, after which he coached basketball at Edinboro University of Pennsylvania. He also coached football at Northwestern High School in Albion, Pennsylvania in the 1960s and early 1970s. Prior to joining Houston, he played baseball for one season at Clarion State College (now Clarion University) and returned to Clarion after his playing days earning a degree in 1965.

References

External links

1942 births
Living people
Clarion Golden Eagles baseball players
New York Mets coaches
Salisbury Braves players
Minor league baseball managers
Baseball coaches from Pennsylvania